Isle aux Herbes, also known as Coffee Island, is a barrier island located in the Mississippi Sound south of downtown Bayou la Batre, Alabama.

The island is an important site for colonial nesting shorebirds in coastal Alabama.

Barrier islands of Alabama
Landforms of Mobile County, Alabama